The Tremellodendropsidaceae are a family of fungi in the class Agaricomycetes. The family currently comprises a single genus containing a small group of clavarioid fungi with partly septate basidia.

References

Agaricomycetes
Basidiomycota families